E. gracilis may refer to:
 Eisenia gracilis, a kelp species in the genus Eisenia
 Eleginus gracilis, the saffron cod, a commercially harvested fish closely related to true cod
 Eleutherodactylus gracilis, a species of frog in the family Leptodactylidae endemic to Colombia
 Encheliophis gracilis, a pearlfish species in the genus Encheliophis
 Eucalyptus gracilis,  a tree native to Australia
 Eudiaptomus gracilis, a crustacean of the genus Eudiaptomus
 Euglena gracilis, a unicellular protist species
 Eulophia gracilis, an orchid species occurring from Western Tropical Africa to Angola

Synonyms
 Epeira gracilis, a synonym for Argiope argentata, a spider species

See also
 Gracilis (disambiguation)